Venerable Elias the Hermit (also known as Elias of Egypt) was a desert dwelling monk of the fourth century AD.  He led the ascetic life for nearly eighty years in a mountain cave of Egypt.  He is recorded to have lived 110 years.

Venerable Elias the Hermit, of Egypt is commemorated 8 January by the Orthodox and Byzantine Catholic Churches.

References 

Orthodox Church in America

See also

Desert Fathers
Stylites

Saints from Roman Egypt
Egyptian hermits
Elias
4th-century Christian saints
Desert Fathers